The Al. Ringling Theatre in Baraboo, Wisconsin, United States, opened its doors in November 1915 and has been operating continuously ever since. Designed by the architectural firm Rapp and Rapp, it was built by Albert Ringling, one of the circus Ringling Brothers, for $100,000.  Over the years, it has featured performances from vaudeville and silent movies to grand opera starring such notables as Lionel Barrymore and Mary Pickford.

The design of the theater is based on the Orpheum Theatre, built by Rapp and Rapp in Champaign, Illinois in 1914.  The decor of the auditorium is said to have derived from Ange-Jacques Gabriel's opera house of 1763-1770 in the Palace of Versailles but some believe it to be at least equally based on Victor Louis's 1780 Grand Théâtre de Bordeaux.

Originally the theater had a Style 1 Wurlitzer theater pipe organ. Later a 9 rank, 3 manual Barton with a "circus wagon" style console replaced the Wurlitzer.

The Al Ringling Theater was featured in an episode of PBS's History Detectives, where they investigated whether it was the country's first great movie palace.

Notes

External links
Al. Ringling Theater home page

Beaux-Arts architecture in Wisconsin
Buildings and structures in Sauk County, Wisconsin
Movie palaces
Theatres completed in 1915
Theatres on the National Register of Historic Places in Wisconsin
Tourist attractions in Sauk County, Wisconsin
National Register of Historic Places in Sauk County, Wisconsin
1915 establishments in Wisconsin
Baraboo, Wisconsin
Public venues with a theatre organ